TVR Internațional (abbreviated as TVRi, is the international channel of Televiziunea Română, Romania's government-funded television network.  TVR International provides free-to-air 24-hour broadcast throughout Europe, Canada and the US.  In July 2005, it introduced broadcasts to Australia and New Zealand.

The channel provides content mainly in Romanian, for Romanians throughout the world, but also in Romania's minority languages, especially Hungarian, Romany and German.  Some content is also provided in English. The channel is broadcast live on the internet.

Its most watched programming during the year is the Eurovision Song Contest.

In 2020, TVR launched an HD feed of TVR i on TVR+. It broadcasts in 720p format.

References

External links 
 Official Site
 Watch TVRi live

International broadcasters
International
Television channels and stations established in 1995
Television stations in Romania